Bizen may refer to: 
 Bizen, Okayama, a city located in the Chūgoku region of western Honshu, the largest island of Japan.
 Bizen Province, an old province of Japan on the Inland Sea side of Honshu
 Bizen ware, a type of Japanese pottery
 Debre Bizen, a monastery of the Eritrean Orthodox Tewahdo Church